Anton Bresler (born 16 February 1988) is a Namibian rugby union player. He plays for English side Worcester Warriors in the Aviva Premiership in the lock position, having previously played for the Sharks.

He moved to Scotland in the summer of 2014, signing for Pro12 side Edinburgh. On 28 December 2017, Bresler joined English Premiership side Worcester Warriors with immediate effect.

On 30 November 2021, Bresler left Worcester as he signed for Top 14 side Racing 92 in France with immediate effect

References

External links

itsrugby.co.uk Profile

1988 births
Living people
Edinburgh Rugby players
Expatriate rugby union players in Scotland
Rugby union locks
Rugby union players from Windhoek
Sharks (Currie Cup) players
Sharks (rugby union) players
South African expatriate rugby union players
South African expatriate sportspeople in Scotland
South African rugby union players
Worcester Warriors players